The Wasan Important Bird Area comprises a tract of some 1,000 ha of rice paddies in the vicinity of the village of Kampong Wasan, in the Brunei-Muara District of Brunei, in north-western Borneo. It has been identified by BirdLife International as an Important Bird Area (IBA) because it supports significant numbers of the populations of various bird species, including lesser adjutants, Chinese egrets, green sandpipers and straw-headed bulbuls.

References

Important Bird Areas of Brunei
Brunei-Muara District